The 1995–96 Boston Bruins season was the team's 72nd season. It was the Bruins' first season at Fleet Center, which replaced Boston Garden as their home venue.

Off-season

Regular season
During the regular season, the Bruins led the league in shots on goal with 2,838.

Final standings

Schedule and results

Playoffs
The Bruins qualified for the playoffs for the 29th consecutive season, an NHL record that still stands (as of the 2020-21 season).  The streak ended one season later.  The Bruins were seeded 5th in the Eastern Conference and faced the 4th-seeded Florida Panthers in the Eastern Conference Quarterfinals.  The Bruins lost the series in five games after falling behind three games to none.  The Panthers went on to lose to the Colorado Avalanche in the Stanley Cup Finals.

Player statistics

Skaters

Goaltending

† Denotes player spent time with another team before joining the Bruins. Stats reflect time with the Bruins only.
‡ Denotes player was traded mid-season. Stats reflect time with the Bruins only.

Awards and records

Transactions

Trades

Free agents

Waivers

Draft picks
Boston's draft picks at the 1995 NHL Entry Draft held at the Edmonton Coliseum in Edmonton, Alberta.

Notes
 The Bruins acquired this pick as the result of a trade on August 26, 1994 that sent Glen Wesley to Hartford in exchange for first-round picks in 1996, 1997 and this pick.
 The Bruins fifth-round pick went to the Detroit Red Wings as the result of a trade on January 17, 1994 that sent Vincent Riendeau to Boston in exchange for this pick (125th overall).

See also
1995–96 NHL season

References

Boston Bruins seasons
Boston Bruins
Boston Bruins
National Hockey League All-Star Game hosts
Boston Bruins
Boston Bruins
Bruins
Bruins